Lilia Taïbi (born 8 May 1981) is an Algerian former footballer who played as a defender. She has been a member of the Algeria women's national team.

Club career
Taïbi has played for ASE Alger Centre in Algeria.

International career
Taïbi capped for Algeria at senior level during the 2006 African Women's Championship.

References

1981 births
Living people
People from Bab El Oued
Footballers from Algiers
Algerian women's footballers
Women's association football defenders
Algeria women's international footballers
21st-century Algerian people